Tony O'Shea (born 1947) is an Irish photographer who has made work about Irish life. He lives in Dublin.

Life and work
O'Shea was born in Valentia Island off the Iveragh Peninsula in County Kerry, Ireland and lived there for 20 years. He studied English and Philosophy at University College Dublin. From 1981 he worked full-time as a photographer with In Dublin magazine. When In Dublin ceased publication, O'Shea worked as a press photographer for Sunday Business Post for many years.

Personal life
O'Shea lives in Dublin with his wife Sarah, and their daughters Keelin and Siúin.

Publications

Books of work by O'Shea
Bad Blood: A Walk Along the Irish Border. Macmillan, 1987. Writing by Colm Tóibín, photographs by O'Shea.
Dubliners. London: Macdonald illustrated, 1990. Photographs by O'Shea, text by Tóibín. .
Little, Brown, 1992. 
The Light of Day. Bristol: RRB; Dublin: Gallery of Photography Ireland, 2020. With a text by Tóibín. "The book is a retrospective of O'Shea's work, spanning 4 decades from 1979 to 2019 and is published to coincide with an exhibition of his work at the Gallery of Photography Ireland."

Zines of work by O'Shea
Christmas Turkey Market, Dublin, 1990–1993. Southport: Café Royal, 2015.
Italia 90: Dublin. Southport: Café Royal, 2017. Edition of 200 copies.
Border Roads 1990–1994. Southport: Café Royal, 2017. Edition of 250 copies.
Never Forget. Southport: Café Royal, 2017. Edition of 250 copies.
Ways of the Cross. Southport: Café Royal, 2018. Edition of 250 copies.

Exhibitions
Irish Gallery of Photography, Dublin, 1990

References

Street photographers
20th-century Irish photographers
21st-century Irish photographers
Alumni of University College Dublin
Photographers from Dublin (city)
People from Iveragh Peninsula
Living people
1947 births
Place of birth missing (living people)